Dziedzic is a Polish toponymic surname referring to Dziedzice, which in turn is derived from the word "dziedzic" (heir, successor). It may refer to:

 Anna Dziedzic, Australian constitutional law scholar
 Augustyn Dziedzic (1928–2008), Polish weightlifter
 Janusz Dziedzic (born 1980), Polish footballer
 Joe Dziedzic (born 1971), American ice hockey player
 Jonathan Dziedzic (born 1991), American baseball player
 Kari Dziedzic (born 1962), American politician
 Katarzyna Dziedzic, Miss International Canada
 Stanley Dziedzic (born 1949), American wrestler
 Stefan Dziedzic (1927–2006), Polish alpine skier
 Walt Dziedzic (1932–2018), American politician

See also
 

Polish-language surnames